Helge Stjernholm Kragh (born February 13, 1944) is a Danish historian of science who focuses on the development of 19th century  physics, chemistry, and astronomy. 
His published work includes biographies of Paul Dirac, Julius Thomsen and Ludvig Lorenz, and The Oxford Handbook of the History of Modern Cosmology (2019) which he co-edited with Malcolm Longair.

Biography
Kragh studied physics and chemistry at the University of Copenhagen, graduating with a degree in 1970. He earned his Ph.D. in physics in 1981 at the University of Roskilde. He received a second doctorate, in philosophy, from the University of Aarhus in 2007.

Kragh was an associate professor of history of science at Cornell University from 1987 to 1989, a professor at the University of Oslo from 1995 to 1997, and a professor at Aarhus University in Denmark from 1997 to 2015.

As of 2015 he retired, becoming emeritus professor at the Niels Bohr Institute at the University of Copenhagen.
He is also a professor emeritus at the Centre for Science Studies of Aarhus University.

Kragh's areas of study are the history of physics from the mid-19th century onward, the history of astronomy, the history of cosmology and the history of chemistry.  He is known for his work on the history of the periodic system, early quantum atomic models, speculative cosmology and the northern lights.

Honors and awards
2019, Roy G. Neville Prize for Julius Thomsen: A Life in Chemistry and Beyond (2016), Science History Institute
 2019, Abraham Pais Prize for History of Physics, American Physical Society (APS)
 President, European Society for the History of Science 2008–2010
 Member, Académie Internationale d'Histoire des Sciences (corresponding member since 1995, full member since 2005)
 Member, Royal Danish Academy of Sciences and Letters

Selected writings 
  Julius Thomsen: A Life in Chemistry and Beyond (2016)
 Ludvig Lorenz: A Nineteenth-Century Theoretical Physicist (2018)
 The Weight of the Vacuum (2014)
 Masters of the Universe (2015)
 Varying Gravity: Dirac’s  Legacy  in  Cosmology and Geophysics (2016)
 Dirac: A Scientific Biography. Cambridge University Press 1990, 2005, 
 Quantum Generations: A History of Physics in the Twentieth Century. Princeton University Press, 1999
 An introduction to the Historiography of Science. Cambridge University Press, 1987
 Matter and Spirit in the Universe: Scientific and Religious Preludes to Modern Cosmology. 2004
 Conceptions of Cosmos: From Myths to the Accelerating Universe: A History of Cosmology. Oxford University Press, 2006
 Cosmology and Controversy: The Historical Development of Two Theories of the Universe. Princeton University Press, 1999
 The Moon that wasn't – the saga of Venus' spurious satellite. Birkhäuser, 2008
 Den Sære Historie om Venus' Måne og Andre Naturvidenskabelige Fortællinger (The Strange History of Venus' Moon and Other Scientific Tales). Lindhardt og Ringhof, 2020, 
 Entropy Creation: Religious Contexts of Thermodynamics and Cosmology. Ashgate, London 2008
 with David Knight, eds.: The Making of the Chemist: The Social History of Chemistry in Europe, 1789–1914. Cambridge University Press, 1998
 with Peter C. Kjargaard & Henry Nielsen: Science in Denmark – A Thousand-Year History. Aarhus University Press, 2009
 with Malcolm Longair, eds.: The Oxford Handbook of the History of Modern Cosmology. Oxford University Press, 2019
 Max Weinstein: Physics, Philosophy, Pandeism, History and Philosophy of Physics, 2019
 Foreword, Max B. Weinstein, World and Life Views, Emerging From Religion, Philosophy and Perception of Nature, trans. Deborah Moss, 2021
 List of Kragh's publications up to 2015 at Aarhus University

References

1944 births
Historians of physics
Danish physicists
University of Copenhagen alumni
Living people